HMS Mariner was the name-ship of the Royal Navy Mariner-class composite screw gunvessel of 8 guns.

Construction

Designed by Nathaniel Barnaby, the Royal Navy Director of Naval Construction, her hull was of composite construction; that is, iron keel, frames, stem and stern posts with wooden planking. She was fitted with a 2-cylinder horizontal compound expansion steam engine driving a single screw, produced by Hawthorn Leslie. She was rigged with three masts, with square rig on the fore- and main-masts, making her a barque-rigged vessel.  Her keel was laid at Devonport Royal Dockyard on 8 January 1883 and she was launched on 23 June 1884.  Her entire class were re-classified in November 1884 as sloops before they entered service.

Career

Mariner was commissioned into the Royal Navy on 19 March 1885.  She became a boom defence vessel in 1903 and was lent to the Liverpool Salvage Association as a salvage vessel in 1917, with her sister-ship .  She was laid up from 1922 to 1929 and sold to Hughes Bolckow of Blyth on 19 March 1929.

References
 

 

Mariner-class gunvessels
Ships built in Plymouth, Devon
1884 ships
Victorian-era gunboats of the United Kingdom
World War I sloops of the United Kingdom